Dmitrijus Guščinas (born 12 December 1975) is a Lithuanian former professional footballer who played as a forward.

International career
Guščinas made five appearances for the Lithuania national team.

References

1975 births
Living people
Lithuanian footballers
Association football forwards
Lithuania international footballers
Holstein Kiel players
VfL Osnabrück players
VfB Stuttgart II players
TuS Koblenz players
VfR Neumünster players
2. Bundesliga players
3. Liga players
Lithuanian expatriate footballers
Lithuanian expatriate sportspeople in Germany
Expatriate footballers  in Germany